The Rattles are a German rock band, formed in Hamburg in 1960, best known for their 1970 psychedelic hit single, "The Witch".

Career
The Rattles performed in Hamburg, and played at the same venues as The Beatles on several occasions in 1962. In 1964, the group recorded "Zip-A-Dee-Doo-Dah", which charted in the UK. In 1968, they recorded their first version of "The Witch", with vocals by Henner Hoier. The band's records sold well in Germany throughout the 1960s.

Their second version of "The Witch" in 1970, this time with vocals by Edna Bejarano, was their only international hit. It reached the Top 10 on the UK Singles Chart, the top 20 in Austria, and the Billboard Hot 100 in the U.S. It eventually sold over one million copies.

Rosetta Stone released a gothic rock cover of "The Witch" in the 1990s. The Norwegian psychedelic hard rock band, Motorpsycho, covered the song during 1999 and 2000. A recording of this song can be found on their bootleg Live Union Scene from 14 April 1999.

Members
Current members
Herbert Hildebrandt - bass
Manfred Kraski - vocals, guitar
Eggert Johannsen - guitar
Reinhard "Dicky" Tarrach - drums

Former members
Achim Reichel (vocals, guitar, 1960–66, 1988–91)
Bernd Schulz (keyboards, 1967–68)
Dieter Sadlowsky (drums, 1960–63)
Edna Béjarano (vocals, 1970–73)
Eggert Johannsen [Martin Storm] (vocals, rhythm guitar, 1994–present)
Franz "Piggy" Jarnach (keyboards, vocals, 1991–95)
Frank Dostal (vocals, 1966–67)
Frank Mille (guitar, vocals, 1970–77)
Frank Seidel (keyboards, 1996–present)
Georg "George" Meier (guitar, vocals, 1969–70, 1974–77)
George Miller (drums, 1975–77)
Hans Joachim "Hajo" Kreutzfeld (guitar, 1961–65)
Henner Hoier (keyboards, vocals, 1968–70, 1988–93)
Herbert Bornholdt (drums, 1973)
Herbert Hildebrandt (bass, vocals, 1960–68, 1988–present)
Hermann "Rugy" Rugenstein (guitar, vocals, 1965–68)
Jochen "Lu Lafayette" Peters (keyboards, 1973–77)
Kurt "Zappo" Lüngen (bass, 1968–73, 1974)
Linda Fields (vocals, 1974–77)
Manne Kraski (guitar, vocals, 1991–present)
Peter "Peet" Becker (drums, 1968–70)
Rainer Degner (guitar, vocals, 1967–69)
Reinhard "Dicky" Tarrach (drums, 1963–67, 1988–present)
Volker Reinhold (guitar, vocals, 1960–61)
Wolfgang "Al" Brock (drums, 1974)

 (This was the basic mid 1960s line-up. By the time of "The Witch" they had all left and successively been replaced by other musicians, with Edna Bejarano now being the lead singer.)

Discography

Singles

Albums
 Twist im Star-Club (1963)
 Twist-Time im Star-Club Hamburg (1964)
 Live im Star-Club Hamburg (1964)
 The Searchers Meet the Rattles (1964)
 Rattles (1965)
 Star Club Show 1 (1966)
 Liverpool Beat (1966)
 Hurra, die Rattles kommen (Soundtrack to the film of the same name) (1966)
 Remember Finale Ligure (1967)
 The Witch (1971)
 Tonight Starring Edna (1972)
 Gin Mill (1974)
 Attention (1975)
 Hot Wheels (1988)
 Painted Warrior (1990)
 New Wonderland (1993)
 Live (1997)
 Say Yeah! (2007)

Compilation albums
 Die deutschen Singles A&B (1963–1965), Vol. 1 (2000)
 Die deutschen Singles A&B (1965–1969), Vol. 2 (2000)
 Come On And Sing - Best (2004)
 Goldene für die Rattles (1970)
 Greatest Hits (1997)

References

External links

Richie Unterberger, [ The Rattles] at Allmusic

Musical groups from Hamburg
Musical groups established in 1960
Beat groups
1960 establishments in West Germany